The Arab Academy for Science, Technology & Maritime Transport (AASTMT) is a regional university operated by the Arab League which runs programs in marine transportation, business, and engineering. AASTMT started as a notion in the Arab League Transport Committee''s meetings on 11th of March, 1970. The Academy's inception was in 1972 in the city of Alexandria, Egypt. After that it expanded into Cairo.

The Arab Academy for Science and Technology
AASTMT's name has become the Arab Academy for Science and Technology: "A university specialized in maritime transport and many other disciplines" and its certificates have been made equivalent to those granted by Egyptian universities.

The Arab Academy for Science, Technology and Maritime Transport (AASTMT)
Over five years (from 1991 to 1996), the educational and maritime training services were funded by the Egyptian Ministry of Transport. Consequently, in 1992, the AASTMT was granted the most modern training ship, "Aida 4", as a donation from the Japanese government.

In 1994 the AASTMT was awarded the most modern simulator in the world (completed in two phases) from the USA administration. Cooperation with the American counterpart continued to found an advanced technology center. Scholarships have exceeded 120,000 for students from 58 countries.

The World Bank has chosen the AASTMT from four international organizations representing the Norwegian Swedish Group, the Hungarian Group and the Danish Group to develop maritime education in Bangladesh by a limited tender. The AASTMT proposal was chosen as the best both technically and financially to carry out the project.

In October 1996 modified its title from: "The Arab Academy for Science and Technology: A university specialized in maritime transport." to "The Arab Academy for Science, Technology and Maritime Transport" (AASTMT).

Certificates
The AASTMT has obtained the approval of the Egyptian Supreme Council of Universities for considering the holders of the High Seas Second Officer eligible for the affiliation with any Egyptian University or any 4-year higher education entity which a student can join after high school.

The AASTMT has flexibility in the process of transferring marine officers from vocational studies to that which allows them to obtain the bachelor's degree in Marine Navigation Technology. This is due to the application of the American Credit Hours System. In order to show the importance of this achievement, the holder of the High Seas Captain certificate, when sent to the United Kingdom to obtain the bachelor's degree, had to start his studies over regardless of his previous studies. However, due to the flexibility of the current system the AASTMT applies, it opened the door for its officers to obtain the bachelor's degree as well as the eligibility certificate in four years.

A report which was prepared by the Japan Transport Cooperation Association in March 1997 tells of the AASTMT progress and the flexibility with which it switched to science and technology then to science, technology and maritime transport. AASTMT has made its certificates equivalent to those granted by Egyptian universities in the fields of engineering and management.

Services and student activities
Services include dormitories, hostels and restaurants. The girls hostel can accommodate up to 100 girls.

Seminars and lectures are organized by the Cultural Activities Department in addition to trips and athletic activities. Students organize the annual Parents Day.

The first female sea captain in Egypt is Marwa Elselehdar who studied in the Department of Maritime Transport and Technology. She works on the Aida IV (IMO: 9018775), a training ship owned by the Egyptian government.

Community service programmes and continuous education
AASTMT offers educational programmes to serve the community of Alexandria. The programmes enhance the skills of students in language, computing, secretarial work, aviation tickets reservation, marketing and management.

The programmes start-over every three months, and run all year round. They are carried out at the AASTMT headquarters in Miami, Sidi Bishr and downtown. The programmes are offered according to an evening schedule. The courses are sometimes designed for groups of employees in a company or organizations. The estimated number of those benefiting from these programmes throughout the year, ranges from 15,000 to 20,000 Alexandrians. There are summer courses for the education of children which benefit around 5,000 children.

Colleges
Maritime Transport & Technology
Archaeology and Cultural Heritage
Engineering & Technology
Management & Technology
Computing & Information Technology
Graduate School of Business
International Transport & Logistics
Language & Communication
Fisheries Technology & Aquaculture
 College of Pharmacy
 College of Law
 College of Dental Medicine
 College of Artificial Intelligence
 College of Medicine

These colleges can be in Arabic, English or French languages.

Institutes 
 Maritime Safety Institute Alexandria.
 Productivity & Quality Institute  Alexandria.
 Technical & Vocational Institute Alexandria.
 Institute of International Transport & Logistics Alexandria & Cairo.
 Port training Institute Alexandria & Port Said.
 Institute for Language Studies Alexandria  &  Cairo.
 Investment & Finance Institute Alexandria.
 Arab Institute for Trade & Commodities Exchange Alexandria.
 Maritime Upgrading Studies Institute Alexandria.

Centers 
 Academy Publishing Center 
 Strategic Marketing & Entrepreneurship Center 
  Industry Service Center Alexandria.
  Marine Hotel Center Alexandria.
  Information and Documentation Center Alexandria.
  Multimedia Center Alexandria.
  Regional informatics Center Alexandria.
  Computer Services Center Alexandria.
  Computer Networks & Data Center Alexandria.
  Research & Consultation Center Alexandria & Portsaid.
  Business Development Center Alexandria.
  Regional Center for Disaster Risk reduction Alexandria.
  Arab Center for Transport Study Alexandria.
  Arab Center for Media Alexandria.
  Maritime Certificates Renewal
  International Maritime Transport Forum
  Agreements and International Cooperations Center

Deaneries
 International Education Programs Deanery Alexandria.
 Community Service and Continuing Education Alexandria.
 Deanery of Postgraduate Studies Alexandria.
 Deanery of Student Affairs Alexandria.
 Deanery of Sports Alexandria.

Complexes
 Integrated Simulators Complex Alexandria   & Portsaid.
 International Maritime Organization Compound Alexandria.

Campuses
Alexandria (Main HeadQuarter).
Cairo. Sheraton Branch & Dokki Branch
PortaSaid.
 Aswan
 Smart Village
 Alamein
Abroad:
Lattakia, Syria.
Khor Fakkan, Sharjah, United Arab Emirates

Branches under construction:
Yemen
Sudan.

See also
 Colleges and Universities in Alexandria
 Education in Egypt
 List of universities in Egypt

References
 
 AASTMT website
 AAST official Facebook page

External links 
 AASTMT website
 AASTMT Colleges
 AAST Official Facebook page
 Ports Training Institute
 League of Arab States
 Graduate School of Business
 Computing and Information Technology
 Human Rights Watch: The Repression of Academic Freedom in Egyptian Universities.
 Multimedia Center
 Madrastyonline site
 AASTMT Institutes
 AASTMT Centers
 AASTMT Alumni
   
 https://web.archive.org/web/20091219123347/http://www.mena.eng.vt.edu/
 Egypt: Arab Science and Technology and Maritime College Profile

 
Universities in Syria
Education in Alexandria
Buildings and structures in Latakia
Education in Latakia
Educational institutions established in 1972
1972 establishments in Egypt
Universities in Egypt
Transport education